Jinshan Football Stadium is a multi-use stadium in Jinshan District, Shanghai. It is currently used mostly for football matches.  The stadium has a capacity of 30,000 people.

Footnotes

Sports venues in Shanghai
Football venues in China